Pier is a given name, a form of Peter, which may refer to:

Pre-20th century
 Pier Jacopo Alari Bonacolsi (c. 1460–1528), Italian sculptor
 Pier Luigi de Borgia, 1st duke of Gandía (c. 1460–1491), Valencian noble
 Pier Luigi Carafa (1581–1655), Italian cardinal
 Pier Paolo Crescenzi (1572–1645), Italian Catholic cardinal
 Pier Gerlofs Donia (c. 1480–1520), West Frisian warrior, pirate and rebel
 Pier Luigi Farnese, Duke of Parma (1503–1547), first Duke of Parma, Piacenza and Castro
 Pier Leone Ghezzi (1674–1755), Italian Rococo painter and caricaturist
 Pier Leoni (died 1128), Roman consul
 Pier Francesco Mazzucchelli (1573–1626),  Italian painter and draughtsman
 Pier Antonio Micheli (1679–1737), Italian botanist and Catholic priest
 Pier Francesco Mola (1612–1666), Italian painter
 Pier Francesco Orsini (1523–1583), Italian military leader and patron of the arts
 Pier Maria Pennacchi 1464–before 1515), Italian painter
 Pier Francesco Tosi (c.1653–1732), Italian castrato singer, composer, and writer on music
 Pier Paolo Vergerio the Elder (1370–1444 or 1445), Italian humanist, statesman and canon lawyer
 Pier Paolo Vergerio (c. 1498–1565), Italian religious reformer

Later
 Pier Angeli (1932–1971), Italian actress
 Pier Luigi Bersani (born 1951), Italian politician
 Pier Paolo Bianchi (born 1952), Italian former Grand Prix motorcycle road racing world champion
 Pier Ferdinando Casini (born 1955), Italian politician
 Pier Giacomo Castiglioni (1913–1968), Italian architect and designer
 Pier Luigi Cherubino (born 1971), Spanish former footballer
 Pier Giorgio Frassati (1901–1925), Italian Catholic social activist beatified by the Catholic Church
 Pier Gonella (born 1977), Italian guitarist
 Pier Giacomo Grampa (born 1936), Italian bishop in Switzerland
 Pier Morten (born 1959), Canadian judoka and wrestler
 Pier Luigi Nervi (1891–1979), Italian engineer
 Pier Carlo Padoan (born 1950), Italian economist and Minister of Economy and Finances 
 Pier Pander (1864–1919), Dutch sculptor and designer of medals
 Pier Antonio Panzeri (born 1955), Italian politician and MEP
 Pier Paolo Pasolini (1922–1975), Italian writer, film director and poet
 Pier Giorgio Perotto (1930–2002), Italian electrical engineer and inventor
 Pier Ruggero Piccio (1880–1965), Italian World War I flying ace and founding Chief of Staff of the Italian Air Force
 Pier Giacomo Pisoni (1928–1991), Italian historian, paleographer and archivist
 Pier Luigi Pizzi (born 1930), Italian opera director, set designer, and costume designer
 Pier Antonio Quarantotti Gambini (1910–1965), Italian writer and journalist 
 Pier Andrea Saccardo (1845–1920), Italian botanist and mycologist
 Pier Vittorio Tondelli (1955–1991), Italian writer
 Pier Tol (born 1958), Dutch footballer
 Pier Vellinga (born 1950), Dutch climatologist

See also
 Piers (name)

Italian masculine given names
Dutch masculine given names